John Richard 'Rick' Stepp is an anthropologist and ethnobiologist who currently holds the position of UF Research Foundation Professor at the University of Florida. Stepp was previously the G. P. Wilder Professor of Botany at the University of Hawaii.

His work examines the strong relationship between biological diversity and cultural diversity. Stepp was trained at the Universities of Florida and Georgia under the respective tutelage of Howard T. Odum and Eugene P. Odum. He has also been involved in research on the importance of weeds as medicinal plants for indigenous peoples.  He serves as a regional governor for Slow Food USA. He was the editor-in-chief of the Journal of Ethnobiology from 2005 to 2008, president of the Society for Economic Botany (2014), and president of the International Society of Ethnobiology (2018-2020).

References

Living people
Ethnobiologists
21st-century American botanists
1973 births